Wrangler: Anatomy of an Icon is a 2008 American documentary film about the life of Jack Wrangler, produced and directed by Jeffrey Schwarz of Automat Pictures. It had its premiere at the 2008 New York Lesbian, Gay, Bisexual, & Transgender Film Festival (Newfest) and is distributed by TLA Releasing.

The documentary chronicles the life of Jack Wrangler, the professional name of John Robert Stillman in his role as a gay porn star who rapidly became one of the first performers in gay pornography to achieve star status and a cult following. The documentary also features his transitioning to roles such as straight porn star, his romantic relationship with and later marriage to singer Margaret Whiting, his activism in supporting and promoting AIDS charities and his later career as a theatrical producer and director.

Cast
Interviews with:
 Jack Wrangler - Himself
 Margaret Whiting - Herself, Songbird
 Robert Alvarez - Himself, Filmmaker / Co-Founder, Hand in Hand Films
 Brooks Ashmanskas - Himself, Friend / Co-Star in Dream
 Michael Bronski - Himself, Author & Historian
 Spring Byington - Actress (archive footage)
 Gino Colbert - Himself, Adult Actor & Director / Asst. to Chuck Vincent
 Durk Dehner - Himself, Tom of Finland Foundation
 Samuel R. Delany - Himself, Author (billed as Samuel Delaney)
 Michael Denneny - Himself, Friend and Christopher Street (magazine) editor
 Jack Deveau - Himself, Founder, Hand in Hand Films (archive footage), director of Porn film A Night at the Adonis (starring Jack Wrangler and Chris Michaels, Big Bill Eld and Mandingo)
 Andy Devine - Himself and (archive footage)
 Casey Donovan - porn actor, (archive footage)
 Jerry Douglas - Himself, Gay Adult Film Director
 Kevin Duda - Himself, actor and Co-Star in Dream

Reception
The documentary won a GayVNAward in 2009 for Best Alternative Release. Wrangler died on April 7, 2009 at the age of 62 due to emphysema.

See also
List of gay porn stars

References

External links 

Wrangler: Anatomy of an Icon Facebook page

2008 films
2008 documentary films
American LGBT-related films
Documentary films about gay male pornography
American documentary films
Documentary films about American pornography
2008 LGBT-related films
Films directed by Jeffrey Schwarz
Documentary films about LGBT topics
2000s English-language films
2000s American films
English-language documentary films